The 1979–80 season was the Jazz sixth season in the NBA and its first in Utah. The Jazz averaged 102.4 points per game (ranked 22 in NBA) while allowing an average of 108.4 points per game (ranked 10th in NBA). The attendance was 320,649 (ranked 21st in NBA). The attendance figure was worse than the last season in New Orleans, where the club had an attendance of 364,205 (ranked 18th in NBA). In addition, the Jazz move from the Central Division to the Midwest Division (with the Indiana Pacers replacing them).

Draft picks

Roster

Regular season
Pete Maravich was waived by the Jazz on January 18, 1980, and was quickly picked up by the Boston Celtics where he played the rest of the season alongside Larry Bird.

Season standings

Record vs. opponents

Game log

|- style="background:
| 1
| October 12
| @ Portland
| 85-101
|
|
|
| Rose Garden
| 0-1
|- style="background:#fcc;"
| 2
| October 15
| Milwaukee
| 107-131
|
|
|
| Salt Palace
| 0-2
|- style="background:#fcc;"
| 3
| October 18
| Portland
| 92-107
|
|
|
| Salt Palace
| 0-3
|- style="background:#fcc;"
| 4
| October 20
| @ Golden State
| 96-101
|
|
|
| Oracle Arena
| 0-4
|- style="background:#cfc;"
| 5
| October 22
| San Diego
| 110-109
|
|
|
| Salt Palace
| 1-4
|- style="background:#fcc;"
| 6
| October 23
| L.A. Lakers
| 87-102
|
|
|
| The Forum
| 1-5
|- style="background:#fcc;"
| 7
| October 25
| Chicago
| 113-105
|
|
|
| Salt Palace
| 2-5
|- style="background:#cfc;"
| 8
| October 27
| @ Denver
| 96-116
|
|
|
| McNichols Sports Arena
| 2-6
|- style="background:#fcc;"
| 9
| October 31
| @ Kansas City Kings
| 108-125
|
|
|
| Kemper Arena
| 2-7

Player stats
Note: GP= Games played; REB= Rebounds; AST= Assists; STL = Steals; BLK = Blocks; PTS = Points; AVG = Average

Awards

Transactions
Added Bernard King to Roster

References

 Jazz on Basketball Reference

Utah Jazz seasons
Uta
1979 in sports in Utah
Utah Jazz